Moncey may refer to:

 Bon Adrien Jeannot de Moncey (1754–1842), Marshal of France, and a prominent soldier in the French Revolution and Napoleonic Wars
 Moncey, Doubs, a commune of the Doubs département in France

See also
Moncé (disambiguation)